Nightcap is an American sitcom that was created by and starring Ali Wentworth with supporting roles by Lauren Blumenfeld, Brendan Clifford, Don Fanelli, Jacob Wallach and Cherie Corinne Rice. On January 12, 2016, the series was picked up for a 10-episode first season. On October 27, 2016, the series was renewed for a second season. The series premiered on Pop on November 16, 2016.

Plot
Staci Cole is the overworked head talent booker on the fictitious fifth highest-rated late night talk show called Nightcap with Jimmy, where she and her fellow workers interact with different celebrities that will appear on the show.

Cast

Main
Ali Wentworth as Staci Cole, the head talent booker on Nightcap with Jimmy.
Lauren Blumenfeld as Penny Jones, Staci's assistant.
Don Fanelli as Todd Mitchell, Jimmy's best friend and a producer on Nightcap with Jimmy.
Jason Tottenham as Davis Maxfield (season 2), a marketing executive sent in by the network.
Jacob Wallach as Randy Wolfe (season 1; recurring season 2), an audio guy on Nightcap with Jimmy. 
Cherie Corinne Rice as Malik Walker (season 1; season 2), a popular celebrity publicist.

Recurring
Jeff Hiller as Phil Miller, a security guard.
Paulina Porizkova as Ana (season 1), Jimmy's personal stylist.
Karl Gregory as Marcus Rice, the make-up designer on Nightcap with Jimmy.
Brendan Clifford as Grady Dupont, the personal chef on Nightcap with Jimmy.
Jordan Clifford as Brady Dupont (season 2), Grady's identical twin brother who is also a chef.
Ashley Park as Olivia Cho (season 2), a social media coordinator brought on by Davis.
Barbara Tirrell as Sonya Yenin (season 2), a worker in the props department.
Judy Gold as Deb Hafner (season 2), a director on Nightcap with Jimmy.
Mehmet Oz as himself (season 2)

Series overview

Episodes

Season 1 (2016–17)

Season 2 (2017)

Reception
In a mixed review, Robert Lloyd of the Los Angeles Times described the show as "a shaggy, amiable trifle in which character is sometimes subservient to quips." A more favorable review in Variety described the show as "lightweight, rewarding, and extremely watchable comedy."

References

External links
 

2016 American television series debuts
2017 American television series endings
2010s American single-camera sitcoms
English-language television shows
Television series about television
Television series by Lionsgate Television
Pop (American TV channel) original programming